Gerald Anthony "Jerry" Zawadzkas (January 3, 1946 - September 3, 2008) was an American football tight end who played in one season, for the Detroit Lions. He also played for the Bridgeport Jets.

Early life and education
Jerry Zawadzkas was born on January 3, 1946, in Torrington, Connecticut and attended Torrington High School. He went to college at Columbia.

Professional career
Detroit Lions

He was drafted in the 16th round (401st overall) by the Detroit Lions. In his first season, he only had one statistic; a 0-yard kick return. He also appeared in the film "Paper Lion".

New York Jets

In 1968, he was signed by the New York Jets. He was later sent to the Bridgeport Jets. 1968 was the year the Jets won the Super Bowl.

Bridgeport Jets

When he was with the Bridgeport Jets, he scored two touchdowns. He did not play anymore after 1968.

Later life and death
After playing football, he went to City College of New York to get a Master's Degree in physics. After getting a masters degree, he worked at Exxon Research Center. In 1978, he moved to Albuquerque, New Mexico to become a scientist at Sandia National Laboratories. He was a nuclear and radiation researcher. He retired in 2003. He died on September 3, 2008, in Albuquerque, New Mexico. He was 62 at the time of his death. He was survived by his wife, three sons, daughter, and four grandchildren.

References

1946 births
2008 deaths
American football tight ends
Columbia Lions football players
Detroit Lions players
Players of American football from Connecticut
People from Torrington, Connecticut